Institute of Chartered Accountants may refer to:

 Institute of Chartered Accountants in Australia
 Institute of Chartered Accountants of Bangladesh
 Institute of Chartered Accountants of Barbados
 Institute of Chartered Accountants in England and Wales
 Institute of Chartered Accountants of Ghana
 Institute of Chartered Accountants of Guyana
 Institute of Chartered Accountants of India
 Institute of Chartered Accountants in Ireland
 Institute of Chartered Accountants of Namibia
 Institute of Chartered Accountants of Nepal
 Institute of Chartered Accountants of Nigeria
 Institute of Chartered Accountants of Pakistan
 Institute of Chartered Accountants of Scotland
 Institute of Chartered Accountants of Sierra Leone
 Institute of Chartered Accountants of Sri Lanka
 Institute of Chartered Accountants of Zimbabwe

or:

 Bahamas Institute of Chartered Accountants
 Canadian Institute of Chartered Accountants
 New Zealand Institute of Chartered Accountants
 South African Institute of Chartered Accountants
 Zambia Institute of Chartered Accountants